Stanwellia grisea is a species of false tarantula in the spider family Nemesiidae. It is found in Australia (Victoria).

References

Nemesiidae
Articles created by Qbugbot
Spiders described in 1901